The Ilm is a river in Bavaria, Germany, left tributary of the Abens. Its source is near Altomünster. It is approx. 84 km long. It flows generally north through the small towns Hilgertshausen-Tandern, Reichertshausen, Pfaffenhofen an der Ilm, Geisenfeld and Vohburg. It flows into the Abens near Neustadt an der Donau.

References

Rivers of Bavaria
Rivers of Germany